Montreal's Jewish community is one of the oldest and most populous in the country, formerly first but now second to Toronto and numbering about 100,000 according to the 2001 census. The community is quite diverse, and is composed of many different Jewish ethnic divisions that arrived in Canada at different periods of time and under differing circumstances.

Montreal's first Jews were Sepharadi and Ashkenazi Jews who had previously settled in Britain and from there moved to Canada as far back as the 18th century. Predominant in number and cultural influence throughout much of the 20th century were the Ashkenazi Jews who arrived from Eastern Europe mostly prior to and following World War II; they settled largely along the Main and in the Mile End, a life vividly chronicled by such writers as Mordecai Richler. There is also a substantial number of French-speaking Mizrahi and Sephardi Jews, originating from former French colonies in the Middle East and North Africa. More recent arrivals include significant numbers of Russian Jews, Argentinian Jews, and French Jews as well as some Indian Jews, Ethiopian Jews and others. Close to 25% of Montreal's Jewish population have French as their mother tongue. Yiddish is still a living part of the Montreal language mix, particularly in the substantial Hassidic community.

Demographically smaller as a result of the exodus that came with the instability provoked by the Quebec sovereignty movement, Montreal's Jewish community has nevertheless been a leading contributor to the city's cultural landscape and is renowned for its level of charitable giving and its plethora of social service community institutions. Among these are the world-renowned Jewish Public Library of Montreal, Saidye Bronfman Centre for the Arts, Dora Wasserman Yiddish Theatre and Montreal Holocaust Memorial Centre.

Jewish culinary contributions have also been a source of pride for Montrealers; two contributions are its smoked meat sandwiches and its distinctive style of bagels. There are many private Jewish schools in Montreal, receiving partial funding of the secular courses in their curriculum from the Quebec government (like most denominational schools in Quebec). Approximately 7,000 children attend Jewish day schools, over 50% of the total Jewish school age population, an extremely high percentage for North American cities.

The Jewish left and secular Jewish culture have flourished in Montreal, producing notable artists and public figures such as Charles Krauthammer, Mort Zuckerman, Naomi Klein, Leonard Cohen, Irving Layton and Gerald Cohen.

History
Shearith Israel, a Spanish-Portuguese congregation, opened in 1768; it was the first Jewish congregation in Montreal. The grave of Lazarus David was the oldest Jewish grave in Montreal; it was dated to 1776.

There were about 6,000 Russian Jews in Montreal in 1900. Jews made up 6-7% of Montreal's population between 1911 and 1931.

In 1921, Greater Montreal had 45,802 Jews, with 93.7% of them being in the City of Montreal. In 1931, about 80% of the 60,087 Quebecers of Jewish origin lived in Montreal. In 1931, 84% of Greater Montreal's Jews lived in Montreal. Between 1921 and 1931 many Jews moved to Outremont and Westmount from Laurier and St. Louis in Montreal.

Montreal has the second largest Jewish community in Canada, and about a quarter (23.2%) of the country’s Jewish population.

Demographics and language

In the 19th century, most Jews from Montreal were of British Sephardic origins, and Montreal did not have a German-Jewish elite that other communities had.

Bernard Spolsky, author of The Languages of the Jews: A Sociolinguistic History, stated that Yiddish "Yiddish was the dominant language of the Jewish community of Montreal". In 1931, 99% of Montreal Jews stated that Yiddish was their mother language. In the 1930s there was a Yiddish language education system and a Yiddish newspaper in Montreal. In 1938, most Jewish households in Montreal primarily used English and often used French and Yiddish. 9% of the Jewish households only used French and 6% only used Yiddish. From 1907 to 1988 the Keneder Adler (Odler, The Canadian Eagle), a Yiddish newspaper, was published in Montreal.

In the 20th century, children in Montreal Jewish households mostly read English publications while parents read publications in French and Yiddish. In 2006, Montreal had more Yiddish speakers than Toronto.

Geography

In 1931, Laurier, St. Louis and St. Michel had the highest concentration of Jews living within the limits of the city of Montreal, with St. Louis having 54.8% of its population being Jewish, Laurier having 50.9% of its population being Jewish and St. Michel having 38.5% of its population being Jewish. During that year, 23.7% of the population of Outremont was Jewish and 7.3% of the population of Westmount was Jewish.

Today, the Jewish community is primarily concentrated in Côte St. Luc, Hampstead, Snowdon, and the West Island. Other major Jewish communities exist in Outremont, Park Extension, and Chomedey.

Politics
In the early 20th century, Jewish representatives of the Montreal City Council, the Quebec legislature, and the Canadian parliament originated from Jewish neighbourhoods in Montreal. Jewish politicians were often elected federally in the ridings of Cartier, which exclusively elected Jewish MPs for its entire history from 1925 until it was abolished in 1966, and Mount Royal. The riding of Outremont also has a significant Jewish population. Provincially, the ridings of Montréal–Saint-Louis (later Saint-Louis) and D'Arcy-McGee often elected Jewish candidates.

Religion
Historically, Orthodox Judaism was strong in Montreal. and Reform Judaism did not become as prominent as in other areas.

Relations with non-Jews
Charles Dellheim, the author of "Is It Good for the Jews? The Apprenticeship of Duddy Kravitz," wrote that Jews often faced conflict from both the Francophone and Anglophone sectors of Montreal.

Education

The Montreal government granted Jews the right to choose whether to pay taxes to Protestant schools or Catholic schools, and therefore the right for their children to attend either school system, in 1870. In 1894 the Montreal Protestant School Board agreed to begin funding the Baron de Hirsch School for Jewish Immigrants in exchange for being the school board of choice for Montreal's Jews. Enrollment increased due to subsequent eastern European Jewish immigration.

Notable residents

See also

History of the Jews in Canada

References

Further reading
 
 Medresh, Israël and Vivian Felson. Montreal of Yesterday: Jewish life in Montreal, 1900-1920 (Dossier Québec series, Mighty Wheels Series). Véhicule Press, 2000.
 Robinson, Ira, Pierre Anctil, and Mervin Butovsku (editors). An Everyday Miracle: Yiddish Culture in Montreal. Montreal: Véhicule Press, 1990.
 Robinson, Ira and Mervin Butovsky (editors). Renewing Our Days: Montreal Jews in the Twentieth Century (Dossier Québec series). Montreal: Véhicule Press, 1995. . See preview at Google Books.
 Smith, Mackay L. The Jews of Montréal and Their Judaisms: A Voyage of Discovery. Aaron Communications, 1998. , 9780968306413. See profile at Google Books.
 Teboul, Victor. Essays on Quebec nationalism and the Jews, Tolerance.ca Publications, 2015.
 Teboul, Victor. Mordecai Richler, an attentive reader of Mythe et images du Juif au Québec, 2015.

External links
 Museum of Jewish Montreal
 The Jewish Community of Montreal, The Museum of the Jewish People at Beit Hatfutsot

Ethnic groups in Canada
Ethnic groups in Montreal
Montreal